Hüls is a placename and surname in the German language, and may also be represented as Huls or Huels in other languages without diacritical marks

Hüls, Huls and Huels may refer to:

Places
 Hüls, a community of Aachen, Germany
 Hüls (Krefeld), a district of Krefeld, Germany
 Hüls, a village of Marl, North Rhine-Westphalia, Germany
 Huls, Netherlands, a hamlet in the southeast Netherlands

Companies and Organizations
 Chemische Werke Hüls, the former name of today's Marl Chemical Park, Marl, Germany
 Hüls AG and Degussa-Hüls, the predecessor companies of Evonik Industries
 hülsta or Hülsta-Werke Hüls Gmbh, a German furniture company
 TSV Marl-Hüls, a football club in Marl, Germany
 VfB Hüls, a football club from Marl, Germany

See also
 Hull (disambiguation), including Hulls